The River Camac (sometimes spelled Cammock, or, historically, Cammoge or Cammoke; Irish:  or ) is one of the larger rivers in Dublin and was one of four tributaries of the Liffey critical to the early development of the city.

Course
The Camac flows from a source on Mount Seskin/Knockannavea mountain north-east of the village of Brittas (southwest of Dublin city), joining other mountain streams, before being diverted by an 18th-century diversion from the Brittas River tributary of the River Liffey.

It flows through a mountain valley named the Slade of Saggart which lies just west of the N81 road (and below the site of the Crooksling tuberculosis sanatorium) southwest of the broad Tallaght plain and east of Newcastle. The river then flows past Saggart, through Kingswood and under the N7. The Camac proceeds through Kilmatead, where there is a small lake with islands, and from there flows into Corkagh Park (formerly Corkagh demesne) where the river was diverted into numerous ponds over the centuries that provided water for local mills. There are two ponds at the back of Kilmateed, a new fishery pond in Corkagh Park, the dry bed of a pond at the back of the Fairview Oil Mill ruins (near Cherrywood), and further downstream next to Moyle Park College, where the water was used by Clondalkin Paper Mills in the past. Many of the concrete ponds are now in poor condition as water levels have dropped and the ponds have silted up. The mill pond serving Leinster Paper Mills was situated on the old Nangor Road, Clondalkin but was covered to make way for a car park and entrance for the Mill Shopping Centre from the Nangor Road side in the late 1980s.

The Camac then flows through Clondalkin village opposite the Garda Station and down Watery Lane, flowing on towards Nangor Road, and meeting tributaries in the industrial Bluebell and Robinhood Estate areas. It then travels through the Lansdowne Valley to residential Drimnagh and Crumlin.

The river goes on to Inchicore, where it is tunnelled under the Grand Canal before a bridge crossing at Golden Bridge.  It runs between Grattan Crescent Park and nearby Richmond Park (home to St Patrick's Athletic) where it gives its name to the ground's 'Camac Terrace', and arrives in Kilmainham, where it runs behind the jail museum and is crossed by Bow Bridge at Bow Lane West. It enters the Liffey alongside Heuston Station, a little upstream of Sean Heuston Bridge. The river was culverted underneath the railway station when it was built in 1846.

Tributaries
The Camac receives tributaries in the Slade of Saggart, including the Ferny Glinn and the Two Slades, and later from around Newcastle, and near Clondalkin (including the Boherboy, Brownsbarn and Fettercairn Streams, the latter joining near the boundary of Corkagh Park, in which the Camac features). Lower tributaries include the Robinhood Stream (Coolfan River), Gallblack Stream (formed from the Blackditch and Gallanstown Streams), Drimnagh Castle (or Bluebell) Stream, and Walkinstown Stream.

See also
 List of rivers in County Dublin
 Rivers of Ireland
 Brittas Pond

References

Bibliography

External links
, song about the River Camac, by Catherine Ann Cullen

River Liffey (system)
Rivers of South Dublin (county)
Rivers of Dublin (city)